Bilitis can refer to:
 The Songs of Bilitis, 1894 collection of French erotic poetry attributed to the fictional Bilitis, a purported contemporary of Sappho
 Trois chansons de Bilitis (Three Songs of Bilitis), a song cycle by Claude Debussy composed in 1897, based on the poems 
 Daughters of Bilitis, the first lesbian civil rights organization in the United States, formed in 1955
 Bilitis (film), 1977 romantic drama directed by David Hamilton